Andrew Michael Smith (born 1 October 1967) is a former English cricketer. He was born at Dewsbury in Yorkshire.

Smith was an effective swing bowler for Gloucestershire, and played a single Test for England at Headingley in 1997 against Australia. Graham Thorpe dropped Matthew Elliott at first slip while on 29, for what would have been Smith's first (and only) Test wicket. Elliot went on to make 199 and Australia won comfortably by an innings.

He was never picked to play for England again, but remained one of the most consistent swing bowlers on the county circuit until his retirement in 2003. He later worked as an employment solicitor at Bevan Brittan in Bristol.

References

External links 
 

1967 births
Living people
England Test cricketers
English cricketers
Gloucestershire cricketers
People educated at Queen Elizabeth Grammar School, Wakefield
Cricketers from Yorkshire
British Universities cricketers